Petervale is a suburb of Johannesburg, South Africa. It was located in Region 3 of the City of Johannesburg Metropolitan Municipality.

Petervale is located next to the N1 highway and is bounded by the suburbs of Rivonia, Bryanston and Paulshof. It is further close to Sunninghill and Morningside Manor. In Petervale there is a small shopping centre and a clinic, a block of flats, a bakery, a garage (petrol station), a laundromat, a post-office, a DVD rental franchise outlet. There is also a large field that forms part of the Region 3 green belt. The field is currently earmarked for residential development in 2007.

Petervale can be reached by travelling on the N1 highway (South or North) and taking the Rivonia offramp. Drive north on Rivonia Road and turn left into Witkoppen Road. Drive past the Cambridge office park and turn left into Cambridge Road. Follow it over the highway into Petervale.

From Petervale, Rivonia and Bryanston can be reached by following Twelfth Avenue.

References

Johannesburg Region E